Arkansas Highway 76 (AR 76, Ark. 76 and Hwy. 76) is the designation for a state Highway in the U.S. state of Arkansas. AR 76 is located in southwest Arkansas, and is split into two sections. The first section begins at U.S. Route 371 (US 371), and ends at US 278. Both sections are very rural.

Route description

Section 1 
The western terminus for AR 76 is at US 371 just south of Rosston. From there, the route heads east towards US 278 where its eastern terminus is located.

Section 2 
The western terminus for AR 76 is at AR 57 and AR 387 just south of Chidester, or just west of White Oak Lake State Park. From there, the route heads east towards AR 24, intersecting Poison Springs Battleground State Park along the way. Highway 76's eastern terminus is at AR 24, just southeast of Bragg City or just northwest of Camden.

Major intersections

References

External links

076
Transportation in Nevada County, Arkansas
Transportation in Ouachita County, Arkansas